The red-chested sunbird (Cinnyris erythrocercus) is a species of bird in the family Nectariniidae.
It is found in Burundi, Democratic Republic of the Congo, Ethiopia, Kenya, Rwanda, South Sudan, Tanzania, and Uganda.

Taxonomy and systematics 
The red-chested sunbird was originally described as Nectarinia erythrocercus by Gustav Hartlaub in 1857 based on specimens from near the White Nile.

References

red-chested sunbird
Birds of East Africa
red-chested sunbird
Taxonomy articles created by Polbot